The Secretary for Culture, Sports and Tourism is the head of the Culture, Sports and Tourism Bureau for the Hong Kong Government, which is responsible for cultural, arts, and sports affairs previously handled by the Home Affairs Bureau, and works related to movie, creative industry, and tourism originally under the Commerce and Economic Development Bureau, in order to promote Hong Kong's culture better.

The position could trace back to Secretary for Municipal Services in 1980s, of which the portfolio included culture and sports. It was replaced by the Secretary for Broadcasting, Culture and Sport (later ), responsible for managing Hong Kong's broadcasting services, developing the film and public entertainment industries, promoting Hong Kong's Arts and Culture, and providing support to sports and physical recreation facilities. The position was  abolished in 1998 after re-organization.

List of office holders
Political party:

Secretaries for Municipal Services, 1985–1989

Secretaries for Broadcasting, Culture and Sport, 1989–1997

Secretary for Broadcasting, Culture and Sport, 1997–1998 

Culture affairs were handled by Secretary for Home Affairs between 1998 and 2022.

Secretary for Culture, Sports and Tourism, 2022–

References

Positions of the Hong Kong Government